Joonas Toivanen (born April 2, 1991) is a Finnish professional ice hockey player who is currently playing for Espoo United (ice hockey) in the Mestis.

External links

1991 births
Finnish ice hockey centres
KalPa players
Living people
People from Varkaus
Sportspeople from North Savo